John Reeves was an American Negro league outfielder in the 1900s.

Reeves made his Negro leagues debut in 1906 with the Leland Giants. He went on to play for the Indianapolis ABCs in 1908.

References

External links
Baseball statistics and player information from Baseball-Reference Black Baseball Stats and Seamheads

Year of birth missing
Year of death missing
Place of birth missing
Place of death missing
Indianapolis ABCs players
Leland Giants players
Baseball outfielders